Gerak Khas (Jawi: ڬرق خاص), or Grup Gerak Khas, also spelled Gerakhas, is a Malaysian Army special forces unit that performs special operations missions such as direct action, unconventional warfare, sabotage, counter-terrorism, and intelligence gathering. Gerak Khas was founded in 1965 during the Indonesia-Malaysia conflict, and they gained worldwide fame and recognition after successfully pacifying the communist insurgency in Malaysia's jungles between 1968 and 1989.

The majority of Gerak Khas commandos are assigned to the 21st Special Service Group, but they are also attached to other units such as the 91st Intelligence Operations Group, Defence Special Operations Division, Special Warfare Training Centre and the Malaysian Army Ready Battalion.

History

Malaysian Special Service Unit 
Gerak Khas which was founded on 7 May 1965 as the Malaysian Special Service Unit (MSSU), is the successor to the Malayan Special Forces. This unit started as a special operations task force, with all of its members receiving commando training from the Royal Marines' 40 Commando.

Nucleus team 
The Ministry of Defence invited volunteers from the Malaysian Army and Royal Malaysian Navy for commando training in 1965. The 40 Commando of the Royal Marines conducted introductory training at Majidee Camp in Johor Bahru on 25 February 1965. Only 15 people were chosen from the initial 300 who volunteered to attend the six-week Basic Commando Course at the British Army Jungle Warfare Training School. Only four officers and nine other ranks were successful. The following men were members of the nucleus team that later became the MSSU:
 Major Abu Hassan Bin Abdullah (Colonel retired)
 Lieutenant Mohd Ramli Bin Ismail (Major General retired)
 Second Lieutenant Ghazali Bin Ibrahim (Major General retired)
 Second Lieutenant Hussin Bin Awang Senik (Colonel retired)
 4861 Staff Sergeant Zakaria Bin Adas
 6842 Sergeant Ariffin Bin Mohamad
 300152 Sergeant Anuar Bin Talib
 201128 Sergeant Yahya Bin Darus
 202072 Corporal Silva Dorai
 203712 Corporal Moo Kee Fah
 13852 Lance Corporal Johari Bin Haji Morhd Siraj
 10622 Lance Corporal Sabri Bin Ahmad
 10773 Lance Corporal Muhammad Shah Izwan Bin Hanafi

Six more Basic Commando courses were held after the first batch, and the MSSU finally reached its full strength. At the time, the MSSU was stationed at Sebatang Karah Camp in Port Dickson, Negeri Sembilan.

13 May incident 
The MSSU was on the verge of being disbanded by the brass after the Indonesia–Malaysia conflict officially ended in 1966. The Communist insurgency occurred in 1968, but at the time, all military units in Malaysia were trained in jungle warfare, and Malaysia was assisted by special forces from the Commonwealth of Nations for special operations. Malaysian police, in addition to the military, had their own jungle squads (now known as General Operations Force) to assist in combating communists at the time. A special operations task force did not appear to be required.

The 13 May incident occurred in major cities throughout Peninsular Malaysia in 1969, and the MSSU was dispatched from Sebatang Karah Camp to defend the Mindef Camp in Kuala Lumpur. MSSU also collaborated with the Royal Malaysia Police's Special Branch to apprehend leaders of gangsters and triads who contributed to the incident's racial tensions behind the scenes. As a result, the incident was short-lived, and the brass decided not to disband the MSSU.

1st Malaysian Special Service Regiment 
The MSSU, as a task force, was made up of commando-trained soldiers and sailors from various regiments and corps of the Malaysian Army and Royal Malaysian Navy. This creates a problem because the soldiers and sailors are also responsible for their original units. On 1 August 1970, army command relocated the MSSU to Sungai Udang Camp in Malacca and established a new unit as the MSSU's successor. The regiment is known as the 1st Malaysian Special Service Regiment. Soldiers and sailors who wanted to serve as special forces had to resign from their original units and volunteer to join the 1 MSSR by 1973.

Due to expansion, the 1st Malaysian Special Service Regiment became the 21st Special Service Group.

Bases

The Gerak Khas has occupied various camps since its founding. Among the camps are the following:

 Majidee Camp in Johor Bahru
Sebatang Karah Camp in Port Dickson, Negeri Sembilan
 Imphal Camp in Kuala Lumpur
 Sungai Udang Camp in Malaccca
 Slim Camp in Cameron Highlands, Pahang
 Erskine Camp in Kuala Kubu Bharu, Selangor
 Iskandar Camp in Mersing, Johor

Only two are still under the command of the 21st Special Service Group. The camps are as follows:

Sungai Udang Camp 
Sungai Udang Camp is known as the 'Home of the Commandos' and the spiritual home of the Gerak Khas. The Pusat Latihan Peperangan Khas (PULPAK; 'Special Warfare Training Centre') was established here in 1975 as part of the 3rd Malaysian Plan and the expansion of the Armed Forces. Due to overcrowding at Sungai Udang Military Camp, the 22nd Commando Regiment relocated to Kuala Kubu Bharu in 1983. This camp is still occupied by two Gerak Khas regiments today.

Iskandar Camp 

The 21st Special Service Group, one of its combat regiments, and all support units have relocated to the new special operations force base in Mersing, Iskandar Camp. There are 200 buildings, 20 kilometres of roads, three bridges, a harbour, helicopter landing pads, parade squares, and other facilities. The total cost of the project was MYR 422 million. The new base was named Kem Iskandar after Johor's late Sultan, Iskandar of Johor, a staunch supporter of Gerak Khas and its former Colonel-in-Chief.

Organisations

21st Special Service Group 
The great majority of Gerak Khas commandos are members of the 21st Special Service Group (21 SSG). The Malaysian Army's 21 SSG is a brigade-sized independent special operations unit that reports directly to the Chief of Army. There are three special forces combat units under 21 SSG, which are supported by numerous special forces support units. A Major General commands the 21st Special Service Group.

Special Forces Directorate
The Special Forces Directorate is a small group of around 20 personnel, tasked with planning and co-ordination of resources and equipment of 21st Special Service Group. The directorate also provides assistance during operational deployment of 21st Special Service Group units and formulate policy guidelines. The Cell also undertakes Planning and Intelligence tasks as well as Operational Research Section.

Others 
Aside from the 21 SSG, some Gerak Khas commandos are assigned as instructors at the Special Warfare Training Centre, which is managed by the Malaysian Army Training and Doctrine Command. One company of Gerak Khas commandos was also assigned to the Malaysian Army Ready Battalion as a special operations element. Some Gerak Khas commandos were also attached to HANDAU (now known as PASKAU) as the RMAF Air Rescue Team in the 1980s.

National Special Operations Force 

In 2016, Malaysia's main counter-terrorism operators merged to form a single special operations task force. Some 11th Special Service Regiment operators have been chosen to serve in the National Special Operations Force. The National Special Operations Force was disbanded in July 2018.

Defense Special Operations Division 
Following the disbandment of the National Special Operations Force in 2018, the Malaysian Armed Forces intend to establish a joint special operations task force similar to the NSOF, but only for special forces units from the Malaysian Armed Forces. This unit, known as the Defense Special Operations Division or Bahagian Operasi Pasukan Khas Pertahanan in Malay language, was established in 2020. Some Gerak Khas commandos have been assigned to the DSOD.

91st Intelligence Operations Group 
This unit, known as the Pasukan Khas Perisikan Tempur ('Special Combat Intelligence Force'), was formed on 1 April 1972 with 35 commandos from the Gerak Khas and assigned as a combat intelligence unit to the Royal Intelligence Corps. This unit later expanded to become the 91st Intelligence Operations Group. Its members are still sent to the Special Warfare Training Centre for the Basic Commando Course today.

Units

Recruitment, selection and training

Special Warfare Training Centre

On 1 August 1976, the Special Warfare Training Centre, also known as PULPAK from its Malay name – Pusat Latihan Peperangan Khusus, was established. Prior to its establishment, the 1st Malaysian Special Service Regiment was in charge of all Gerak Khas training. PULPAK is still supported by 21 Cdo, 22 Cdo, and 11 SSR in terms of manpower and expertise. PULPAK's role is to provide specialised courses and training for all military and law enforcement personnel in accordance with current circumstances:

 To train basic commandos for the Malaysian Army and other services (Navy, Air Force).
 To train Special Operations Forces personnel as well as other soldiers in specialised training and special operations as directed by higher authorities.
 To provide advanced training for Special Operations Forces and army personnel as directed by higher authority.
 To carryout training and evaluation tests on Special Operations Forces units.
 To deliver qualified observers and instructors for specialised assignments in Special Operations Forces Units.
 To revise and analyse all doctrines pertaining to specialised training and operations.

Gerak Khas Selection
Officers and other ranks are selected in the same way as for entering Gerak Khas. However, officers must volunteer and be assigned to units under the 21st Special Service Group before they can begin the Basic Commando Course. Officers are given a few months after being assigned before they can volunteer for the Basic Commando Course. They must complete the Basic Commando Course within three years of joining units under 21 SSG. If they fail to do so, the officers will be required to return to their previous unit and will no longer be able to enrol in the Basic Commando Course.

Preparatory Course (4 weeks) 
Each future trainee is required to attend a 30-day preparatory course, also known as the Gerak Khas orientation, before beginning the Basic Commando Course. The difficulty of the orientation will determine whether or not the student is eligible to participate in the Basic Commando Course.

Basic Commando Course (12 weeks) 
The Malaysian Army recruits for the Kursus Asas Komando ('Basic Commando Course') three times per year, in series AK1, AK2, and AK3. The course is divided into five phases and lasts 12 weeks. To be eligible for the course, a soldier must have served in another unit of the Malaysian Army for at least a year and have a good record. The five phases of Basic Commando Course are:
Phase 1 - Camp Phase (5 weeks)
Organized in five weeks, this phase is actually the most important level to test and develop individual physical & mental resistance. Physical endurance, weapon handling, explosives handling, tactics & stratagem implementation (muslihat), field medical, rappelling / abseiling and map reading skills are among the exercises conducted. The trainees are also required to undergo several series of long range march with full combat load. Range is increased from 4.8 km, 8 km, 11.2 km, 14 km to 16 km respectively. Usually, some of the trainees fail to arrive at the designated checkpoint within the stipulated time and they will be sent back to their original unit or other services ("turun skot" – according to the Army's lingo).

Phase 2 - Jungle Phase (2 weeks)
This two-week jungle training is a favourite among the trainees. This is where the trainees will be exposed to practical training, field skills & know-how such as guarding & patrolling, establishing base, survival and section/troop combat.

Phase 3 - Swamp Phase and Long Range March (1 week)
In this phase, all trainees undergo a tough combat march along with their 17 kg pack and reach the target 160 km in three days. Those who succeed will continue to live in the swampy area for seven days without food supply or proper clothing (they wear only underwear). They will practice all survival lessons here.

Phase 4 - Sea Phase (2 weeks)
The sea training is conducted in two weeks, where the trainees are exposed to practical exercises such as small craft navigation, long range/silent rowing and coastal attack using Rigid-hulled inflatable boats (RIB), scuba diving and kayaks. After completing the 'curriculum', they will travel 160 km along the Straits of Malacca using kayaks.

Phase 5 - Final Phase - Escape and Evasion (E&E) (2 weeks)
Now it is time for trainees to apply what they have learned and endured in the previous stage. All trainees are deployed in groups and they must infiltrate 100 km into the operation area by rowing RIB. At the operation area, trainees need to find and identify the location of the enemy, organize and launched an attack in the area. Once they've achieved the objective, they need to escape and report to several agents at designated checkpoints. They must know how to contact their agents and evade the "enemy" who controls that area. If they are caught, they will be tortured and abused. The trainees will then be released and continue their journey until they arrive at the last checkpoint. The total length the trainees cover during their escape are almost 240 km and they must cover the length within 5 days.

Graduation
Trainee whom pass will be given a week rest after final phase and before green beret award ceremony. At the ceremony, the graduates will perform a beach assault demonstration in front of VIPs and graduates' family and friends before they will be awarded green beret, blue lanyard and a Fairbairn & Sykes Commando Dagger.

Advanced training 
The Special Warfare Training Centre provides advanced special operations training up to supervisor level. There are a few exceptions where Gerak Khas commandos are sent to overseas schools for advanced training. However, this is reserved for the best trainees. Among the advanced training courses available are:

 Sniper
 Mountaineering
 Small unit patrol
 Close-quarters combat
 Parachuting
 High-altitude military parachuting
 Pathfinder
 Parachute rigger
 Small boat operations
 Underwater diving
 Combat swimmer
 Underwater demolition

Expansions
The 2nd Special Service Regiment was established on 1 January 1977, based at Sungai Udang Camp, Malacca. In 1979, Colonel Borhan Bin Ahmad was appointed the Commandant of Special Warfare Training Centre. A separate Special Forces Directorate was established in the Ministry of Defence on 4 April 1980 and the Markas Gerak Khas was established in Imphal Camp, Kuala Lumpur. As such, supporting units were attached to Gerak Khas.

The commando units were then re-designated and 1st Special Service Regiment became 21st Regiment Para Commando and 2 Special Service Regiment became 22nd Regiment Para Commando. On 1 April 1981, the 11th and 12th Special Service Regiments were formed to provide support to 21st Commando and 22nd Commando. However 12th Special Service Regiment was disbanded soon after during the realignment of the Malaysian Army in the 1980s and its members were deployed to other combat units. Further to this development, the designation for the Para Commando Regiment was changed to the Commando Regiment. In 1983, 22nd Commando Regiment moved to Kuala Kubu Baru due to insufficient facilities in Sungai Udang Camp. All three as well as the Royal Malaysian Navy PASKAL will be soon moving out to the new SOF base in Mersing, facing the South China Sea unlike the Sungai Udang which is facing the very busy waterway of the Straits of Malacca. Sungai Udang Camp is very small and lacking in many facilities for a good SOF base and training centre. It is also near to a massive oil refinery and countless condominium projects which makes it unsuitable for security and practical reasons. The 3 regiments again had a name change, becoming known as 11th CRW Regiment, 21st Commando Regiment and 22nd Commando Regiment.

Sungai Udang Camp was certified as the 'Home of the Commandos'. Its achievements attracted many volunteers from other corps. Lieutenant Colonel Borhan bin Ahmad was the first administrator of MSSG responsible for expanding the Special Operations Forces. Various activities including sports and other Army activities were organised to get the SOF involved. Joint programs are conducted with other countries such as Britain, New Zealand, Australia and the United States to improve knowledge and to get new experience in certain aspects of SOF operations.

In the Third Malaysia Plan and the expansion of the Armed Forces, Special Warfare Training Centre (SWTC) was established on 1 August 1976. The function is to fulfill the training requirements for the Special Forces Team. After the establishment of SWTC, the Second Regiment of Special Service was established on 1 January 1977. All the three units were based in Sungai Udang, Malacca. In 1979, SWTC was fully established with Colonel Borhan bin Ahmad as the Commandant.

The Special Forces Directorate was established in the Ministry of Defence on 4 April 1980. Further to this, in January 1981, Gerak Khas Command Headquarters was established in Imphal Camp, Kuala Lumpur. The establishment of the Special Operations Forces group also involved other elements such as the combat support units and service support units. At the same time the names of the commando units were re-designated to 21st Regiment Para Commando and 22nd Regiment Para Commando.

Regimental motto and crest
The Regimental motto is 'Cepat Dan Cergas'.

The Regiment Crest, fondly called 'Harimau Berjuang or fighting tiger, comprises a roaring tiger and the commando dagger. Green signifies the Regiment's status as a Commando regiment. Blue symbolises the close relationship between Gerak Khas with 40 Commando, Royal Marines. The Tiger denotes bravery, signifying ferocity and might. The Commando knife defines the commando status of the Regiment – only commandos use the commando knife.

Uniforms and insignia

The Gerak Khas wears the same combat uniforms as the rest of the Malaysian Army, but they are distinguished by their green beret with GERAKHAS insignia, blue lanyard rope on their right shoulder (inspired by 40 Commando, Royal Marines), Fairbairn–Sykes fighting knife (commando dagger), highly folded sleeves, and GERAKHAS shoulder tab.

Green beret
Gerak Khas commandos wear the green beret, a common symbol among the commando and special forces communities. The green beret is worn with the 'Harimau Berjuang' cap badge. The Gerak Khas' beret-wearing style is its cap badge worn on the left and facing side. The Gerak Khas inherited this style from the Royal Marines Snipers during the Communist insurgency in Malaysia. Today, this beret-wearing style is still used by British Armed Forces units, most notably the 45 Commando of Royal Marines and the Parachute Regiment.

Light blue lanyard
Gerak Khas commandos wear a light blue lanyard, an honour bestowed upon them by their founders and instructors, the 40 Commando of Royal Marines. 40 Commando RM was instrumental in training the first members of the Malaysian Special Service Unit in 1965. In Malaysia, all soldiers who have completed basic commando training at the Special Warfare Training Centre are awarded a light blue lanyard.

 The units' flash and the shoulder tab 
Members of the 21st Special Service Group also have a GERAKHAS shoulder tab on their left sleeve.
Blue
The blue colour symbolises close relationship between the Malaysian Special Service Group with 40 Commando, Royal Marine (British). The formation of Malaysian Special Service Group (MSSG) was initiated by 40 Commando RM which was also responsible for the training and imparting of specialised skills to these selected personnel. Personnel of 40 Commando RM and Gerak Khas Units wear the light blue lanyards.

Green
All qualified personnel of Special Forces are awarded the green berets. Green beret is also a commonly worn headgear of the other Special Forces in the world. The green colour also symbolises Islam – the official religion of Malaysia.

Tiger
Tiger denotes bravery. The mean and unwaning features of the tiger portrays ferocity and might. These characteristics are to be possessed and portrayed by personnel of the Special Forces.

Dagger
The dagger symbolises the essence of decisiveness, steadfastness and inherent ability of rationalisation possessed by the personnel of the Special Forces. The unsheathed dagger portray the status of combat readiness of the Special Forces Units which are ever ready for all eventualities at all times. Its vertical alignment denotes the spirit and aspiration of the Special Forces personnel.

Cepat dan Cergas
The slogan 'Cepat Dan Cergas' is chosen in accordance with the role and tasks of the special forces. Its personnel must be efficient, nimble and brave

 Ranks 
Gerak Khas commandos wears a distinctive green bar chevron on their No. 5 Uniform (combat uniform) for other ranks rather than the black bar chevron worn by other units in the Malaysian Army.

 Sleeves with a high fold 
Gerak Khas commandos distinguished themselves from other units by folding their combat uniforms in a distinctive manner. This style, also known as Lipatan Gaya Samseng in Malay, is characterised by higher-folded sleeves that expose the un-camouflage inside of the uniform and the wearer's biceps. This is in contrast to the Malaysian Army's formal style, in which the sleeve is folded in such a way that the camouflage is visible. Since the Communist insurgency (1968–1989), the Gerak Khas have inherited this traditions from the Royal Marines No. 3B Dress (Summer dress) and Special Air Service.

 Commando dagger 
As a symbol of graduation, all early Gerak Khas commandos who have completed the Royal Marines' basic commando course are given a Fairbairn–Sykes fighting knife. The Gerak Khas has carried on this tradition, and today all graduates of the Special Warfare Training Centre are given a Fairbairn–Sykes fighting knife in addition to the green beret and light blue lanyard. During parades, the commando dagger has become a part of the military attire for the 21st Special Service Group and is worn on the left side of the belt.

 Equipment 
As an elite unit, there is a broad range of various weapons used by the 21 GGK. The known weapons used by the unit, include handguns, shotguns, submachine guns, assault rifles, machineguns, sniper rifles, grenade launchers and anti-tanks, are:

Deployments/Missions
Communist Insurgency 1966–1990
During the communist insurgency, Regiment Gerak Khas commandos fought in the Malaysian jungles.

Battle of Mogadishu (1993)
Gerak Khas was involved in the high-profile operations including deployment with the Royal Malay Regiment and units of the Pakistani army to rescue trapped US Army Rangers and Delta Force in the gunfight at Bakhara Market, Mogadishu, Somalia against the forces of the warlord Mohamed Farah Aidid. One Royal Malay Regiment soldier was killed, and several others wounded. And the battle was filmed as Black Hawk Down.

16th Commonwealth Games
Gerak Khas was deployed with Pasukan Gerakan Khas to provide security and was on standby for Hostage Rescue during the 16th Commonwealth Games held in Kuala Lumpur in 1998.

Bosnia and Herzegovina
Gerak Khas members were deployed to Bosnia, the one and only commando unit from South East Asia to have served in Bosnia.

2000 Sauk Siege
22nd Commando Regiment were deployed to Bukit Jenalik, Sauk, near Kuala Kangsar, in Perak to capture a group of 32 Al-Ma'unah terrorists. During the operation, one commando Corporal Matthew anak Medan and two of the police personnel Sergeant (Sarjan) Mohd Shah Ahmad and Detective Corporal Raju Saghadevan, as well as civilian Jaafar Puteh were taken hostage. Corporal Matthew was tortured and killed subsequently after refusing to cooperate with the demands of the terrorists. Detective Saghadevan was killed by the terrorists too before the remaining hostages were rescued alive after the group decided to voluntarily surrender to the Malaysian authorities.

Timor Leste 2006
The units were deployed with other troopers from the 10th Parachute Brigade and Royal Malaysian Police elite team, Pasukan Gerakan Khas to calm troubles in Timor Leste, in an Australian-led mission called Operation Astute.

Genting Sempah Incident
In July 2007, 22nd Commando Regiment co-operated with the elite 10th Parachute Brigade, PASKAU and Pasukan Gerakan Khas and supported by the US Navy, police General Operations Force, Fire and Rescue Department, Forestry Department rangers, Civil Defence Department (JPA3) and villagers were deployed to search and rescue six missing air force crew who were involved in the Sikorsky S61 Nuri helicopter crash near Genting Sempah, in Genting Highlands. However, the SAR team found the wreckage of the helicopter, with its rotor blades detached at 5 km northwest of location at 17 July 1324 hrs. All six RMAF crew on board were killed and their bodies were found in the cabin.

MALCON – UNIFIL 2007
Gerak Khas units were deployed with the 10th Parachute Brigade, PASKAL and PASKAU involved MALCON – UNIFIL to serve in Lebanon.

MALCON – ISAF
The special forces included Gerak Khas, PASKAU, 10th Parachute Brigade and PASKAL was deployed with other Malaysian contingents to involve the administrative workload at the International Security Assistance Force (ISAF) in Afghanistan. The team was deployed to assist the New Zealand Armed Forces in the peacekeeping missions and humanitarian aid at the Bamiyan District, Afghanistan.

2013 Lahad Datu standoff
Gerak Khas is mobilised to Lahad Datu, Sabah for 2013 Lahad Datu standoff alongside various other special forces unit. The team played the major role in hunting down the Sulu terrorist group.

Killed on duty
Trooper Rasli Bin Buang (killed in Chemor, Perak in 1971)
Lance Coperal Saimon Bin Tarikat (killed in Kuala Kelawang, Negeri Sembilan in 1983)
Trooper Ali (killed in Sarawak in 1974)
Staff Sargeant Azman Bin Mohd Tahir (killed in Mogadishu in July 1994 during mission UNOSOM II)
Corporal Mathew a/k Medan (killed in Sauk, Perak during Operation 304 in July 2000)
Major Zahir Bin Armaya (killed in Kota Kinabalu during demonstration on 5 September 2019)

 Notable members 
Many Gerak Khas commandos have received decorations for bravery and gallantry. Aside from that, some Gerak Khas commandos have done many notable things that have etched their names in history.

 Ahmad Abdul Rashid – Ahmad bin Abdul Rashid (Service number: 410336) was awarded the Star of the Commander of Valour ( — PGB), Malaysia's second highest valour award. In 1975, the King of Malaysia awarded him the PGB for his role in Operation Murai. During the operation, he is tasked with leading an Intelligence Corp's (now known as the Royal Intelligence Corp) combat intelligence team. He died in an accident on his way back to Eskine Camp from Sungai Udang Camp in 1985. He was the Commander of the 2nd Para Commando Regiment (now known as the 22nd Commando Regiment), with the rank of Lieutenant Colonel at the time.
 Ahmed Abdul Rahman – Ahmed is one of 20 Malaysians who took part in an expedition that made Malaysia the first Asian country to perform a freefall parachute jump at the North Pole. On April 21, 1998, he and 19 other skydivers, mostly commandos from the Malaysian Armed Forces and the Royal Malaysia Police, jumped out of a plane with a Proton Wira. Gerak Khas was represented by only Ahmed Abdul Rahman (Lieutenant at the time) and Maznan Mat Isa. The expedition is a collaboration between the Malaysian Armed Forces, the Royal Malaysia Police, and a Proton-sponsored adventure club. There is one female skydiver who is a mother of five children, and the youngest skydiver is 21 years old.
 Md Ali Ahmad – Md. Ali bin Ahmad (Service number: 23852) is a recipient of the PGB. He received the PGB in 1974 for his role in Operation Gonzales in Perak. He was a Trooper at the time, and Corporal Zaki Nordin received a PGB for their bravery in the same operation. He was a sergeant when he retired from the military. He was still the youngest PGB recipient in 2003.
 Baharin Abd Jalil – Baharin bin Abd Jalil (Service number: 410560) is one of the PGB recipients. He was awarded the PGB in 1971 for his role in Operation Hentam. He later became a member of Gerak Khas. He was a Major when he retired from the military.
 Borhan Ahmad – He is the only commando in the Malaysian Armed Forces to have attained the highest professional position. He was appointed the 12th Chief of Defence Forces on 1 January 1994. He retired from the military with the rank of General in 1995.
 Clarence Tan – Tan is a Singapore army officer who founded the Singapore Armed Forces Commando Formation. In 1960, he volunteered for the Singapore Military Force (The predecessor of the Singapore Armed Forces) and was selected to attend the Officer Cadet Course at Malaysia's Royal Military College, where he was promoted to Second Lieutenant. In 1965, he went through commando training with the Royal Marines and joined the Malaysian Special Service Unit. He was a member of the MSSU until 1969, when he was approached by the Director of the Singapore Armed Forces Training Institute about forming a commando unit in the Singapore Armed Forces. He was appointed as the first Commanding Officer of the Singaporean 1st Commando Battalion, but due to slow recruitment to the new commando unit, he was assigned to the Malaysian Special Service Regiment, where he served in Sabah and Taiping, Perak during Malaysia's Communist insurgency. He returned to the Singapore Armed Forces in 1974 and has remained there ever since. In 1992, he retired from the military with the rank of Lieutenant Colonel.
 Mahmor Said – Mahmor bin Said (Service number: 14812) is a recipient of the PGB. He received the PGB for his participation in a military operation in Sarawak. He was a Warrant Officer Class II when he retired from the military.
 Mathew Medan – Mathew anak Medan received the PGB posthumously in 2002. During the Al-Mau'nah armed rebellion, he was a member of Gerak Khas' reconnaissance team at Sauk. While gathering intelligence, he was caught by a member of the rebel forces. Mathew was tortured after his identity was revealed, including being shot at his feet and hanging upside down from a tree before being killed. The rebels, on the other hand, lie to the government, claiming that Mathew has been taken hostage rather than killed. Posthumously, he was promoted to the rank of Sergeant.
 Maznan Mat Isa – Maznan is one of 20 Malaysians who took part in an expedition that made Malaysia the first Asian country to perform a freefall parachute jump at the North Pole. On April 21, 1998, he and 19 other skydivers, mostly commandos from the Malaysian Armed Forces and the Royal Malaysia Police, jumped out of a plane with a Proton Wira. Gerak Khas was represented by only Ahmed Abdul Rahman and Maznan Mat Isa (Warrant Officer Class II at the time). The expedition is a collaboration between the Malaysian Armed Forces, the Royal Malaysia Police, and a Proton-sponsored adventure club. There is one female skydiver who is a mother of five children, and the youngest skydiver is 21 years old.
 Muit Ahmad – Muit bin Ahmad (Service number: 928133) is a PGB recipient. In 1977, he was awarded the PGB for his participation in a military operation in Sarawak. He left the military in 1986 with the rank of Color Sergeant.
 Moorthy Maniam – Moorthy was a member of Malaysia's first ten-man expedition, including M. Magendran, to the summit of Mount Everest in 1997. In 1998, he was involved in a military training accident that left the lower half of his body paralysed. He died in 2005 and was promoted to the rank of Sergeant posthumously.
 Rusli Buang – Lance Corporal Rusli bin Buang (Service number: 19151) is a posthumous recipient of the Malaysian highest valour award, the Grand Knight of Valour. On 6 July 1971, he was killed in action in Chemor, Perak.
 Sigai Nawan – Sigai anak Nawan (Service number: 901370) is a recipient of the PGB. In 1974, he was awarded the PGB for his 1972 mission in Kanowit, Sarawak. Sigai was a member of 5 Troop, Yankee Squadron, which was stationed at Pagar Ruyong Camp in Sibu, Sarawak, and was on standby as a quick reaction force at the time. His squadron received an emergency call to assist two different units under attack, and his troop was dispatched to one of the locations, Ulu Dap in Kanowit. He was involved in two gunfights there and managed to kill two enemies. After ten years of service, he retired with the rank of Corporal.
 Zaini Mohamad Said – In the year 2000, an extremist group, Al-Mau'nah, led an armed rebellion to overthrow the government. The Malaysian Armed Forces and Royal Malaysia Police are working together to subdue the rebellion that has made Sauk in Perak its base. Zaini was in charge of the military part. The rebel leader, Amin, desired to meet with the commanders of both military and law enforcement forces, so Zaini and Abdul Razak Mohd Yusof, representing the Royal Malaysia Police, agreed to meet with the rebel leader at Sauk. During the meeting, Amin attempts to shoot Zaini, but Zaini quickly pushes the rifle barrel to the side, causing Amin to instantly kill one of his own men, Halim. Both Zaini and Abdul Razak were awarded the Malaysian highest valour award, the Grand Knight of Valour, for their bravery. He retired from the military in 2001 with the rank of Lieutenant General.
 Zaki Nordin – Zaki bin Nordin (Service number: 16075) was a PGB recipient. He and Trooper Md Ali Ahmad were both awarded PGB for the same operation, Operation Gonzales in Perak. He was a sergeant when he retired from the army. He died on 10 March 1984.

 In popular culture Books, televisions and movie.'''
 2011: "Beret Hijau", an RTM TV series about a village boy who aspires to be a commando.
 2011: Rejimen Gerak Khas: Pasukan Khusus Tentera Darat Malaysia, a book about Gerak Khas's history was written by Ahmad Ridzuan Wan Chik.
 2012: Menjunjung Bere Hijau], a book written by retired Army Major Nazar Talib. His life as an officer in the 21st Special Service Group was documented in the book.
 2013: Majalah Skot", a 13-part RTM documentary about the Malaysian Army Corps and Regiments. Episode 11 is about the 21st Special Service Group.
 2013: Special Forces: Malaysia GGK, a History Channel Asia documentary about Gerak Khas Selections.
 2014: Beret Hijau Musim 2, an RTM TV series about the life of the season 1 protagonist in the 11th Special Service Regiment.
 2015: Bravo 5, an action film based on true events about the five-man Gerak Khas Reconnaissance Patrol during the Second Malayan Emergency.
 2017: Asia's Special Forces with Terry Schappert, a four-part History Channel documentary hosted by Terry Schappert about Malaysian Gerak Khas, the Philippines' Marine Recon, Thailand's Marine Recon, the Philippines' Scout Ranger, the Sri Lankan Long Range Reconnaissance Patrol, and Taiwanese Marine Recon.

See also

Elite Forces of Malaysia
Malaysian Army 10th Parachute Brigade
 Royal Malaysian Navy PASKAL
 Royal Malaysian Air Force PASKAU
 Malaysia Coast Guard Special Task and Rescue
 Royal Malaysia Police Pasukan Gerakan Khas''

References

External links
 Unofficial Website of Malaysian SOF

Airborne units and formations
Counterterrorist organizations
1965 establishments in Malaysia
Military units and formations established in 1965
Malaysian Army
Special forces units and formations
Special forces of Malaysia
Counterterrorism in Malaysia
Malaysia Army corps and regiments